Trenton Corners is an unincorporated community in Persifer Township, Knox County, Illinois. Trenton Corners is just west of the Spoon River at the intersection of U.S. Highway 150 and Knox County Highway 15. There was formerly an early settlers' town called Trenton. In 1888, the Santa Fe Railway located north of the town. The businesses and the population of the town moved closer to the railroad into the new town of Dahinda and Trenton ceased to be a place of importance. Several small businesses were still located in Trenton Corners until recently but none remain today. The Persifer Township hall and maintenance facility and the Trenton Cemetery are located near Trenton Corners.

Unincorporated communities in Knox County, Illinois
Unincorporated communities in Illinois
Galesburg, Illinois micropolitan area
Populated places established in 1888